{{DISPLAYTITLE:C15H11I4NO4}}
The molecular formula C15H11I4NO4 may refer to:

 Dextrothyroxine
 Levothyroxine, or L-thyroxine
 Thyroxine (or T4)

Molecular formulas